Merosargus caeruleifrons is a species of soldier fly in the family Stratiomyidae.

Distribution
United States.

References

Stratiomyidae
Insects described in 1900
Diptera of North America
Taxa named by Charles Willison Johnson